Schedule 3/Schedule III may refer to:
 Schedule III Controlled Substances within the US Controlled Substances Act
Schedule III Controlled Drugs and Substances within the Canadian Controlled Drugs and Substances Act
 Schedule III Psychotropic Substances within the Thai Psychotropic Substances Act
 Schedule III Psychotropic Substances within the U.N. Convention on Psychotropic Substances
 Schedule III Banks within the Canada Bank Act
 Schedule 3 compounds within the Chemical Weapons Convention

See also 
Schedule 1 (disambiguation)
Schedule 2 (disambiguation)
Schedule 4 (disambiguation)
Schedule 5 (disambiguation)